The 2014 Texas Tech Red Raiders baseball team represented Texas Tech University in the 2014 college baseball season. Texas Tech competed in Division I of the National Collegiate Athletic Association (NCAA) as a charter member of the Big 12 Conference. The Red Raiders played home games at Dan Law Field at Rip Griffin Park on the university's campus in Lubbock, Texas. Second year head coach Tim Tadlock led the Red Raiders, a former starting shortstop for the team during the 1990 and 1991 seasons.

Personnel

Coaches

Players

Schedule

"*" indicates a non-conference game.
"#" represents ranking. All rankings from Collegiate Baseball on the date of the contest.
"()" represents postseason seeding in the Big 12 Tournament or NCAA Regional, respectively.

Ranking movements

Notes

References

External links
Official website
2014 Baseball schedule

Texas Tech Red Raiders baseball seasons
Texas Tech
Texas Tech
College World Series seasons
Texas Tech